Leon "Roccstar" Youngblood Jr. is an American music producer, songwriter, recording artist and rapper. Youngblood has written and produced songs for artists such as Chris Brown, Post Malone, Usher, Rita Ora, Fergie, Prince Royce, Kendrick Lamar, J.Lo, and Melissa Etheridge. 

He wrote and produced a number of tracks on Chris Brown's album X, which was nominated for Best Urban Contemporary Album Grammy Award in 2014. The Fifty Shades of Grey soundtrack, which featured Youngblood's song "Rude", was also nominated for a Grammy for best soundtrack in December 2015.

Youngblood is signed to Atlantic Records as an artist. The music video for his own debut single, "Confidence", premiered on Billboard in 2014.

Roccstar was a cast member on Vh1’s ‘Love  and Hip Hop: Hollywood’ and currently a guest star on Vh1’s  ‘Basketball Wives’ series.

Career
Youngblood took Visual and Performing Arts programs at Hollywood High School. Leon Derrick Youngblood SR Roccstar's father introduced him to Chris Lighty who became Roccstar's manager and helped him get a contract with Epic Records. Leon Derrick Youngblood SR got Roccstar signed with Primary Wave Music in 2012. (November 2015)

In 2013, Youngblood began working with Chris Brown, producing and writing alongside Diplo and Timbaland and landing six songs on Brown's album X, including the lead single, "Fine China". Youngblood wrote multiple tracks for J.Lo's album in 2014, and is currently working with a number of other prominent artists. He formed his own company, called RoccAge Entertainment. His debut EP is set for release in 2015.

Selected discography

References

External links
Twitter
Primary Wave artist page

American rappers
Record producers from California
Living people
21st-century American rappers
Year of birth missing (living people)